Cicero: The Philosophy of a Roman Sceptic is a 2015 book by Raphael Woolf, in which the author provides an introduction to Cicero’s role in shaping ancient philosophy.

References 

2015 non-fiction books
Works about Cicero
Routledge books